Lanyon is a surname which originates from the hamlet of Lanyon (Madron), Cornwall, and may refer to:

 Charles Lanyon (1813−1889), English architect
 George Lanyon Hacker (born 1928), English Suffragan Bishop of Penrith
 Ellen Lanyon (1926–2013), American painter and printmaker
 Hastie Lanyon, a fictional character in Strange Case of Dr Jekyll and Mr Hyde
 John Lanyon Whiting (1851–1922), Canadian lawyer and politician
 Karen Lanyon, Australian senior career officer of the Department of Foreign Affairs and Trade
 Mike Lanyon (born 1951), former Australian rules footballer
 Owen Lanyon (1842−1887), British colonial administrator
 Peter Lanyon (1918−1964), Cornish painter
 Ted Lanyon (1939–2008), Canadian retired professional ice hockey player
 Walter C. Lanyon (1887−1967), English religious writer
 Wesley E. Lanyon (1926–2017), American ornithologist and museum curator
 William Carlton Lanyon Dawe, generally known as Carlton Dawe (1865–1935), Australian author
 William James Lanyon Smith (1922–2018), New Zealand naval officer

Places
In Antarctica
 Lanyon Peak, a sharp rock peak in Victoria Land
 Mount Lanyon, a large mountain in the Prince Charles Mountains

In Australia
 Lanyon High School, a school in Canberra
 Lanyon Homestead, an historic site in Canberra
 Lanyon Valley, a suburb of Canberra

In the United Kingdom
 Lanyon (Madron), a farm and hamlet in Cornwall
 Lanyon Place railway station, a railway station in Belfast
 Lanyon Quoit, a dolmen in Cornwall
 West Lanyon Quoit, a dolmen in Cornwall

In the United States of America
 Lanyon, Iowa, an unincorporated area

Arts and entertainment
 The Spectre of Lanyon Moor, a Big Finish Productions audio drama

Companies
 Lanyon, Lynn and Lanyon, a 19th-century firm of Civil Engineers and Architects in Ireland
 Lanyon Solutions, a software company